The 2014 BNP Paribas Open (also known as the 2014 Indian Wells Masters) was a professional tennis tournament that was played at Indian Wells, California, in March 2014. It was the 41st edition of the men's event (26th for the women), known as the BNP Paribas Open, and was classified as an ATP World Tour Masters 1000 event on the 2014 ATP World Tour and a Premier Mandatory event on the 2014 WTA Tour. Both the men's and the women's events took place at the Indian Wells Tennis Garden in Indian Wells, United States, from March 3 through March 16, 2014, on outdoor hard courts.

Points and prize money

Point distribution 

 Players with byes receive first-round points.

Prize money 
The 2014 BNP Paribas Open will feature a significant increase in prize money from the previous year, with all players competing for a share of $6,169,040. All prize money is in US Dollars.

Players

Men's singles

Seeds 
The following are the seeded players. Rankings and seedings are according to ATP rankings on March 3, 2014.

Withdrawn players

Other entrants 
The following players received wildcards into the singles main draw:
 Ryan Harrison
 Steve Johnson
 Rajeev Ram
 Jack Sock
 Rhyne Williams

The following players received entry from the qualifying draw:
 Robby Ginepri
 Samuel Groth
 Daniel Kosakowski
 Alex Kuznetsov
 Dušan Lajović
 Paolo Lorenzi
 Paul-Henri Mathieu
 Daniel Muñoz de la Nava
 Peter Polansky
 Stéphane Robert
 John-Patrick Smith
 Dominic Thiem

The following players received entry as lucky losers:
 David Goffin
 Evgeny Donskoy
 James Ward

Withdrawals 
Before the tournament
 Nicolás Almagro → replaced by  Sergiy Stakhovsky
 Brian Baker → replaced by  Benjamin Becker
 Carlos Berlocq → replaced by  Teymuraz Gabashvili
 Juan Martín del Potro (wrist injury) → replaced by  James Ward
 David Ferrer → replaced by  Alejandro Falla
 Guillermo García López → replaced by  Donald Young
 Marcel Granollers → replaced by  Alex Bogomolov Jr.
 Jürgen Melzer (shoulder injury) → replaced by  Andrey Golubev
 Albert Montañés → replaced by  Tim Smyczek
 Benoît Paire → replaced by  Bradley Klahn
 Michał Przysiężny → replaced by  David Goffin
 Janko Tipsarević (foot injury) → replaced by  Jiří Veselý
 Bernard Tomic (hip injury) → replaced by  Michael Russell
 Filippo Volandri → replaced by  Aleksandr Nedovyesov
 Mikhail Youzhny (back injury) → replaced by  Evgeny Donskoy

Retirements 
 Teymuraz Gabashvili
 Florian Mayer

Men's doubles

Seeds 

1 Rankings as of March 3, 2014.

Other entrants 
The following pairs received wildcards into the doubles main draw:
  Novak Djokovic /  Filip Krajinović
  Jonathan Erlich /  Richard Gasquet

Women's singles

Seeds 
The following are the seeded players. Rankings and seedings are according to WTA rankings on February 24, 2014.  Points before are as of March 3, 2014.

Withdrawn players

Other entrants 
The following players received wildcards into the singles main draw:
 Belinda Bencic
 Victoria Duval
 Nadia Petrova
 Shelby Rogers
 Taylor Townsend
 CoCo Vandeweghe
 Donna Vekić
 Vera Zvonareva

The following players used protected ranking to gain entry into the singles main draw:
 Petra Cetkovská
 Alisa Kleybanova
 Iveta Melzer
 Aleksandra Wozniak

The following players received entry from the qualifying draw:
 Chan Yung-jan
 Casey Dellacqua
 Sharon Fichman
 Camila Giorgi
 Allie Kiick
 Michelle Larcher de Brito
 Olivia Rogowska
 Anna Schmiedlová
 Yaroslava Shvedova
 Alison Van Uytvanck
 Heather Watson
 Barbora Záhlavová-Strýcová

Withdrawals 
Before the tournament
 Jamie Hampton  → replaced by  Julia Görges
 Polona Hercog → replaced by  Chanelle Scheepers
 Maria Kirilenko → replaced by  Shahar Pe'er
 Ayumi Morita → replaced by  Sílvia Soler Espinosa
 Laura Robson (wrist injury) → replaced by  Galina Voskoboeva
 Serena Williams (continued boycott of the event since 2001)  → replaced by  Caroline Garcia
 Venus Williams (continued boycott of the event since 2001) → replaced by  Kurumi Nara

During the tournament
 Lauren Davis (stomach virus)

Retirements 
 Nadia Petrova (lower right leg injury)
 Galina Voskoboeva (upper respiratory infection)

Women's doubles

Seeds 

1 Rankings as of February 24, 2014.

Other entrants 
The following pairs received wildcards into the doubles main draw:
  Martina Hingis /  Sabine Lisicki
  Madison Keys /  Alison Riske
  Svetlana Kuznetsova /  Samantha Stosur
  Andrea Petkovic /  Sloane Stephens
The following pairs received entry as alternates:
  Sharon Fichman /  Megan Moulton-Levy
  Alicja Rosolska /  Sílvia Soler Espinosa

Withdrawals 
Before the tournament
  Nadia Petrova (lower right leg injury)
  Zhang Shuai (right shoulder injury)

Champions

Men's singles 

   Novak Djokovic def.  Roger Federer 3–6, 6–3, 7–6(7–3)

Women's singles 

  Flavia Pennetta def.  Agnieszka Radwańska, 6–2, 6–1

Men's doubles 

  Bob Bryan /  Mike Bryan def.  Alexander Peya /  Bruno Soares, 6–4, 6–3

Women's doubles 

  Hsieh Su-wei /  Peng Shuai def.  Cara Black /  Sania Mirza, 7–6(7–5), 6–2

References

External links 

Association of Tennis Professionals (ATP) tournament profile

 
Indian Wells Masters
BNP Paribas Open
BNP Paribas Open
BNP Paribas Open
BNP Paribas Open